The 2009 LPGA Championship was the 55th LPGA Championship, played June 11–14 at Bulle Rock Golf Course in Havre de Grace, Maryland. This was the second of four major championships on the LPGA Tour in 2009.

Tour rookie Anna Nordqvist, age 22, won her first major title, four strokes ahead of runner-up Lindsey Wright. It was Nordqvist's first career win on the LPGA Tour.

Beginning in 2005, this championship was played at Bulle Rock for five consecutive seasons, ending with this edition.

Past champions in the field

Made the cut

Missed the cut

Round summaries

First round
Thursday, June 11, 2009

Second round
Friday, June 12, 2009

Third round
Saturday, June 13, 2009
Sunday, June 14, 2009

Final round
Sunday, June 14, 2009

Source:

References

External links
Bulle Rock Golf Course
Golf Observer leaderboard

Women's PGA Championship
Golf in Maryland
LPGA Championship
LPGA Championship
LPGA Championship
LPGA Championship